Metalorganic vapour-phase epitaxy (MOVPE), also known as organometallic vapour-phase epitaxy (OMVPE) or metalorganic chemical vapour deposition (MOCVD), is a chemical vapour deposition method used to produce single- or polycrystalline thin films. It is a process for growing crystalline layers to create complex semiconductor multilayer structures.  In contrast to molecular-beam epitaxy (MBE), the growth of crystals is by chemical reaction and not physical deposition.  This takes place not in vacuum, but from the gas phase at moderate pressures (10 to 760 Torr). As such, this technique is preferred for the formation of devices incorporating thermodynamically metastable alloys, and it has become a major process in the manufacture of optoelectronics, such as Light-emitting diodes. It was invented in 1968 at North American Aviation (later Rockwell International) Science Center by Harold M. Manasevit.

Basic principles

In MOCVD ultrapure precursor gases are injected into a reactor, usually with a non-reactive carrier gas.  For a III-V semiconductor, a metalorganic could be used as the group III precursor and a hydride for the group V precursor. For example, indium phosphide can be grown with trimethylindium ((CH3)3In) and phosphine (PH3) precursors.

As the precursors approach the semiconductor wafer, they undergo pyrolysis and the subspecies absorb onto the semiconductor wafer surface. Surface reaction of the precursor subspecies results in the incorporation of elements into a new epitaxial layer of the semiconductor crystal lattice. In the mass-transport-limited growth regime in which MOCVD reactors typically operate, growth is driven by supersaturation of chemical species in the vapor phase. MOCVD can grow films containing combinations of group III and group V, group II and group VI, group IV.

Required pyrolysis temperature increases with increasing chemical bond strength of the precursor.  The more carbon atoms are attached to the central metal atom, the weaker the bond. The diffusion of atoms on the substrate surface is affected by atomic steps on the surface.

The vapor pressure of the group III metal organic source is an important control parameter for MOCVD growth, since it determines the growth rate in the mass-transport-limited regime.

Reactor components

In the metal organic chemical vapor deposition (MOCVD) technique, reactant gases are combined at elevated temperatures in the reactor to cause a chemical interaction, resulting in the deposition of materials on the substrate.

A reactor is a chamber made of a material that does not react with the chemicals being used. It must also withstand high temperatures. This chamber is composed by reactor walls, liner, a susceptor, gas injection units, and temperature control units. Usually, the reactor walls are made from stainless steel or quartz. Ceramic or special glasses, such as quartz, are often used as the liner in the reactor chamber between the reactor wall and the susceptor. To prevent overheating, cooling water must be flowing through the channels within the reactor walls.  A substrate sits on a susceptor which is at a controlled temperature. The susceptor is made from a material resistant to the temperature and metalorganic compounds used, often it is machined from graphite. For growing nitrides and  related materials, a special coating, typically of silicon nitride or tantalum carbide, on the graphite susceptor is necessary to prevent corrosion by ammonia (NH3) gas.

One type of reactor used to carry out MOCVD is a cold-wall reactor. In a cold-wall reactor, the substrate is supported by a pedestal, which also acts as a susceptor. The pedestal/susceptor is the primary origin of heat energy in the reaction chamber. Only the susceptor is heated, so gases do not react before they reach the hot wafer surface. The pedestal/susceptor is made of a radiation-absorbing material such as carbon. In contrast, the walls of the reaction chamber in a cold-wall reactor are typically made of quartz which is largely transparent to the electromagnetic radiation. The reaction chamber walls in a cold-wall reactor, however, may be indirectly heated by heat radiating from the hot pedestal/susceptor, but will remain cooler than the pedestal/susceptor and the substrate the pedestal/susceptor supports.

In hot-wall CVD, the entire chamber is heated. This may be necessary for some gases to be pre-cracked before reaching the wafer surface to allow them to stick to the wafer.

Gas inlet and switching system

Gas is introduced via devices known as 'bubblers'. In a bubbler a carrier gas (usually hydrogen in arsenide & phosphide growth or nitrogen for nitride growth) is bubbled through the metalorganic liquid, which picks up some metalorganic vapour and transports it to the reactor. The amount of metalorganic vapour transported depends on the rate of carrier gas flow and the bubbler temperature, and is usually controlled automatically and most accurately by using an ultrasonic concentration measuring feedback gas control system. Allowance must be made for saturated vapors.

Pressure maintenance system

Gas exhaust and cleaning system. Toxic waste products must be converted to liquid or solid wastes for recycling (preferably) or disposal. Ideally processes will be designed to minimize the production of waste products.

Organometallic precursors

 Aluminium
Trimethylaluminium (TMA or TMAl), Liquid 
Triethylaluminium (TEA or TEAl), Liquid
 Gallium
 Trimethylgallium (TMG or TMGa), Liquid
Triethylgallium (TEG or TEGa), Liquid
 Indium
 Trimethylindium (TMI or TMIn), Solid
 Triethylindium (TEI or TEIn), Liquid
 Di-isopropylmethylindium (DIPMeIn), Liquid
 Ethyldimethylindium (EDMIn), Liquid
 Germanium
 Isobutylgermane (IBGe), Liquid
 Dimethylamino germanium trichloride (DiMAGeC), Liquid
 Tetramethylgermane (TMGe), Liquid
 Tetraethylgermanium(TEGe), Liquid
 Germane GeH4, Gas
 Nitrogen
 Phenyl hydrazine, Liquid
 Dimethylhydrazine (DMHy), Liquid
 Tertiarybutylamine (TBAm), Liquid
Ammonia NH3, Gas
 Phosphorus
 Phosphine PH3, Gas
Tertiarybutyl phosphine (TBP), Liquid
 Bisphosphinoethane (BPE), Liquid
 Arsenic
 Arsine AsH3, Gas
 Tertiarybutyl arsine (TBAs), Liquid
 Monoethyl arsine (MEAs), Liquid
 Trimethyl arsine (TMAs), Liquid
 Antimony
 Trimethyl antimony (TMSb), Liquid
 Triethyl antimony (TESb), Liquid
 Tri-isopropyl antimony (TIPSb), Liquid
 Stibine SbH3, Gas
 Cadmium
 Dimethyl cadmium (DMCd), Liquid
 Diethyl cadmium (DECd), Liquid
 Methyl Allyl Cadmium (MACd), Liquid
 Tellurium
 Dimethyl telluride (DMTe), Liquid
 Diethyl telluride (DETe), Liquid
 Di-isopropyl telluride (DIPTe), Liquid
 Titanium
 Alkoxides, such as Titanium isopropoxide or Titanium ethoxide
 Selenium
Dimethyl selenide (DMSe), Liquid
 Diethyl selenide (DESe), Liquid
 Di-isopropyl selenide (DIPSe), Liquid
 Di-tert-butyl selenide (DTBSe), Liquid
 Zinc
 Dimethylzinc (DMZ), Liquid
 Diethylzinc (DEZ), Liquid

Semiconductors grown by MOCVD

III-V semiconductors
 AlN
 AlP
 AlGaN
 AlGaP
 AlGaAs
 AlGaSb
 AlGaInP
  GaSb
 GaAsP
 GaAs
 GaN
 GaP
 InAlAs
 InAlP
 InSb
 InGaSb
 InGaN
 GaInAlAs
 GaInAlN
 GaInAsN
 GaInAsP
 GaInAs
 GaInP
 InN
 InP
 InAs
 InAsSb
 AlInN

II-VI semiconductors
 ZnO
 ZnS
 ZnSe
 ZnTe
 CdO

IV Semiconductors
 Si
 Ge
 Strained silicon

IV-V-VI Semiconductors
 GeSbTe

Environment, health and safety
As MOCVD has become well-established production technology, there are equally growing concerns associated with its bearing on personnel and community safety, environmental impact and maximum quantities of hazardous materials (such as gases and metalorganics) permissible in the device fabrication operations. The safety as well as responsible environmental care have become major factors of paramount importance in the MOCVD-based crystal growth of compound semiconductors. As the application of this technique in industry has grown, a number of companies have also grown and evolved over the years to provide the ancillary equipment required to reduce risk. This equipment includes but is not limited to computer automated gas and chemical delivery systems, toxic and carrier gas sniffing sensors which can detect single digit ppb amounts of gas, and of course abatement equipment to fully capture toxic materials which can be present in the growth of arsenic containing alloys such as GaAs and InGaAsP.

See also
Atomic layer deposition
Hydrogen purifier
List of semiconductor materials
Metalorganics
Molecular beam epitaxy
Thin-film deposition

References

Chemical processes
Semiconductor growth
Thin film deposition
Semiconductor device fabrication